E-toll may refer to:

 E-toll (Indonesia)
 e-toll (South Africa)
 E-toll (Service NSW competitor to Linkt)

See also
 eToll (Ireland)
 e-TAG (Australia)
 E-ZPass (northeastern USA)
 Electronic toll collection